Uttar Badepasha is a union council in Golapganj Upazila, Sylhet District, Bangladesh, located at .

Demographics
As of the 1991 Bangladesh census, Golabganj has a population of 229,074. Males constitute 50.29% of the population, and females 49.71%. This eighteen Upazila's population is 110,364. Golapganj has an average literacy rate of 36.7% (7+ years), and the national average of 32.4% literate.

Chairmen

Villages 

 Alampur
 Alampur Mandartala
 Amkona
 Anandapur
 Bade Pasha
 Bagla
 Chhalikona
 Chhoyghari
 Choarkandi
 Dakshin Alampur
 Debrai
 Furadabad
 Golapnagar
 Hajirkona
 Jamira
 Kalaim
 Keotkona
 Khagail
 Khash
 Konagaon
 Mirer Chak
 Mollar Chak
 Nohai
 Pitalkuri
 Satan Mardan
 Supatek
 Uttar Alampur

See also
 Upazilas of Bangladesh
 Districts of Bangladesh
 Divisions of Bangladesh

References

Unions of Golapganj Upazila